This is a list of American films that are scheduled to release in 2024.

January–March

April–June

July–September

October–December

References

2024